Eudes de Montreuil was a 13th-century French master builder, sculptor and combat engineer. He may have died in 1289.

He is attributed the main portal of the church of Mantes-la-Ville (Yvelines).

He carved his own tomb: a bas-relief representing him holding a try square and surrounded by his two wives. This tomb disappeared in the fire of the church of the Cordeliers of Paris on 15 November 1580.

De Montreuil may have been the father of architect Pierre de Montreuil.

References

External links 
 Eudes de Montreuil, maître des œuvres des fortifications de Jaffa, une légende franciscaine ? on Persée 

13th-century French architects
1289 deaths